Piano Trio No. 1 in D minor, Op. 32, for violin, cello and piano is a Romantic chamber composition by the Russian composer Anton Arensky. It was written in 1894 and is in four movements:

 Allegro moderato (in D minor and in sonata form) – Unlike the agitated opening melody of the first movement from Mendelssohn's Piano Trio No. 1, this piece opens gently, lyrically and elegiacally, setting an autumnal mood of the whole work. This movement ends with a coda marked "Adagio".
 Scherzo (Allegro molto) (in D major and in ternary form) – The movement in the parallel key (tonic major) features flying notes, and a waltz-like middle section mainly in B-flat major. The movement is cheerful throughout.
 Elegia (Adagio) (in G minor and in ternary form) – Following the cheerful scherzo comes the contrasting and sad slow movement in the subdominant minor. Presenting no formal grief but memorial thoughts, this movement is deeply elegiac but not funereal. The middle section begins in G major but involves a number of key modulations, which makes the passage that initially evokes a brighter mood even more affecting yet dreamlike later on. 
 Finale (Allegro non troppo) (in D minor and in rondo form) – Back in D minor, the movement opens dramatically. Later comes a recollection of themes from the third and first movements, which is followed by a turbulent ending that restates the primary theme of this movement.

The trio is dedicated to the memory of the renowned Russian cellist, Karl Davydov.

The composer made a very early recording of the trio on wax cylinders, with the violinist Jan Hřímalý, the cellist Anatoliy Brandukov, and himself at the piano. This recording was made shortly after its composition and is almost certainly its first recording, although it is not complete.

References

External links
 
 
 Performance of Arensky's Piano Trio No. 1 by The Chamber Music Society of Lincoln Center from the Isabella Stewart Gardner Museum in MP3 format

Arensky 01
1894 compositions
Compositions by Anton Arensky
Compositions in D minor